Upper Onslow is a community in the Canadian province of Nova Scotia, located in Colchester County.

References

Communities in Colchester County